Tusa may refer to:

Locations
 La Tusa, slang for Tucson, Arizona, originating from Mexican American communities rooted in Chicanx border culture of the Southwest United States
 Tusa, Iran, an ancient city in northeastern Iran
 Tusa, Sicily, a comune in the province of Messina, Sicily, Italy
 Tusa, a village in the commune of Sâg, Romania
 Tušice (Hungarian Tusa), a village in the Michalovce district of eastern Slovakia, historically in the Zemplén region of the Kingdom of Hungary

Surname
 Arnold Tusa (born 1940), Canadian politician
 Frank Tusa (born 1947), American jazz double-bassist, composer and educator
 Sir John Tusa (born 1936), British arts administrator and radio and television journalist

Other uses
 "Tusa" (song), a 2019 song by Karol G and Nicki Minaj

See also
 TUSAS, an acronym for Turkish Aerospace Industries (TAI)